The Ludza Estonians (in the Ludza dialect: Lutsi maarahvas – ‘Lutsi Estonians’, in Latvian: Ludzas igauņi) are a group of ethnic Estonians living in and around Ludza, south-eastern Latvia.

History 
Most of the Ludza Estonians probably moved into the area in the 17th century before the Great Northern War, but the settlement may have originated earlier. Throughout the era of feudalism, when life was mostly confined to one's near environment, this ethnic group retained its Estonian identity and ethnographic features. Ludza Estonians were originally Lutherans, but became Catholics and had close contacts with neighbouring Latgalians and Belarusians. As long as the church ceremonies and confessions were held in Estonian, the people had little need to speak Latvian or Belarusian. Nevertheless, the local Latgalian dialect of Latvian, Belarusian, and Russian were spoken to a certain extent in the areas where those people were their neighbours. In manors, Polish was heard (in Latgale, it was the administrative language at the time).

Language
Ludza Estonians speak the Ludza dialect (Ludzī kīļ) which is closely related to Seto. By the 19th century the church had become Latvianised and Russian had become the official language and lingua franca. According to Oskar Kallas, who made a studying trip to area in 1893, there were 4,387 Ludza Estonians of whom some 800 could speak Estonian. In the 1970s and 80s, there were some 20 people left in the area still using the language, but it is now most likely to have perished. The dialect spoken by Ludza Estonians, was closely related to eastern Võro-dialects. It contained about 180 loanwords from Latvian language and some from Russian. Ludza Estonians reportedly had some difficulty understanding standardised Estonian.

References

Sources and external links
 Paul Ariste Keelekontaktid. Tallinn: Valgus 1981. 
 Eestlased Lätis Retrieved May 8, 2007. 
 Väinö Klaus Läti eestlased Retrieved May 8, 2007. 
 Hannes Korjus Lutsi maarahvas – 110 aastat hiljem Retrieved May 8, 2007. 
 Marjo Mela Latvian virolaiset Helsinki: Suomalaisen kirjallisuuden seura 2001,  
 Uldis Balodis http://www.lutsimaa.lv/Lutsimaa__Land_of_the_Ludza_Estonians/Home.html

Social history of Estonia
Latvian people of Estonian descent
Estonian dialects
Ludza
Social history of Latvia
Ethnic groups in Latvia